EZAN is a Russian company that produces a wide range of equipment for science, industry, telecommunications, transport and energy.

History 

Construction of the Experimental Factory of Scientific Engineering of the USSR began in 1970 according to the decision of the Council of Ministers. The plant began work in 1973. Initially, acting director of the organizing EFSE played one of the founders of Chernogolovka F. Dubovitsky.

Managers 
1970 - 1972 F. I. Dubovitsky — director-organizer
1972 - 1986 B. S. Kononov— director
1986 - 1991 L. P. Kokurin — director
1991 - nowadays. V. A. Borodin— general manager

Economic indicators 
In year of 2006.

Business structure

Main engineering units 
Special Design Bureau
Technical department
Department of digital telecommunications equipment
Crystal Growth Laboratory
Central Laboratory
The central laboratory of instrumentation
Quality control department
Service Center

The main types of industries and technologies 
Harvest area
Toolshop
Mechanical workshop
 Welding area
 Foundry
Frame-injection molding workshop
 Area of ceramics and plastics
 Painting area
Electroplating workshop
Installation and assembly workshop

Representative offices

Moscow representative office 
Otkrytoe shosse, 14, office 3/8, Moscow, Russia
Chief: Nikolay Kuznetsov

Vienna representative office 
Donau-City Str.l, A-1220 Vienna, Austria
http://www.russiantechnologies.eu 
Chief: Valery Shevchenko

References

External links
 
Company Profile

Telecommunications companies of Russia
Manufacturing companies of the Soviet Union
Manufacturing companies established in 1973
Technology companies established in 1973
1973 establishments in the Soviet Union
Federal State Unitary Enterprises of Russia
Companies based in Moscow Oblast